is a town located in Nemuro Subprefecture, Hokkaido, Japan. As of September 2016, it has an estimated population of 5,374, and an area of 624.49 km2.

Shibetsu is located at the northeastern end of Hokkaido, in the heart of Nemuro Subprefecture. It is a coastal town, facing the Sea of Okhotsk and backed by the mountains of the Shiretoko Peninsula. To the northeast of Shibestu lies the town of Rausu, to the northwest is Shari, to the south is Betsukai and to the west is the town of Nakashibetsu.

Population 

Although the town's population was 8,051 people in 1965 (Census Data), the amount has continued to decrease to 6,298 people in the year 2000 (Census Data). The effects of depopulation and outflow of young people has left the current population to roughly 5,825 people (Census Data for April 2009).

History 

Pioneer settlers established Shibetsu during the Meiji period (1868-1912) and it quickly became a thriving fishing and farming town.
1901: Uembetsu Village (now Rausu) splits off.
1923: Shibetsu Village becomes second-class municipality.
1946: Nakashibetsu splits off.
1958: Shibetsu Village becomes Shibetsu Town.

Economy 

Salmon, scallop, trout and shellfish farming has been the cornerstone of Shibetsu's livelihood. As of 2009, Shibetsu's fishing industry is estimated to produce 51 billion yen annually (salmon farming making up most of it with 39 billion yen). Shibetsu is also supported by its successful dairy industry with total dairy production annually exceeding 82 billion yen (As of May 2009).

Climate 

Shibetsu is known for its cooler summers and icy winters. Unlike the other major islands of Japan, Hokkaido is normally not affected by the June–July rainy season. In comparison, Hokkaido is relatively less humid and has typically warm summer weather, rather than hot.

Transportation 

As there is no railway line in or near Shibetsu, residents and tourists rely on airplanes and cars to travel to and from the town. Flights to and from Tokyo to nearby Nakashibetsu Airport take roughly 1 hour 40 minutes. Flights to and from Sapporo take approximately 50-60 mins. Travel to Shibetsu by bus or car from Nakashibetsu Airport takes roughly 20-30 mins. Buses depart from the Nakashibetsu Bus Terminal.

Notable people from Shibetsu

Sayuri Osuga, speed skater and cyclist
Toshiko Takeya, Japanese Senator
Shizuo Shinoda, pioneer of musical roads in Japan

References

External links

Official Website 

 
Towns in Hokkaido